Thomas Samuel Jolliffe (born Petersfield House, Petersfield 22 June 1746 - died Ammerdown House, Kilmersdon 6 June 1824)  was a British politician.

Joliffe was the second son of John Joliffe, Member of Parliament for Petersfield from 1741 to 1754, and then again from 1761 to 1768. He was educated at Winchester College.

He was High Sheriff of Somerset from 1792 to 1793.

References

External links
 Visit Petersfield

1746 births
1824 deaths
British MPs 1780–1784
British MPs 1784–1790
People educated at Winchester College
People from Petersfield